Anthony Buck  is the name of:

Sir Antony Buck (1928–2003), British politician
Tony Buck (wrestler) (1936–2021), English wrestler
Anthony Buck (cricketer) (born 1941), English cricketer
Tony Buck (footballer) (born 1944), English footballer
Tony Buck (musician) (born 1962), Australian drummer